Blood Bank is a 2009 EP by Bon Iver. It was released on January 20, 2009, and features four tracks, three of them recorded for the release. The EP is a follow-up to the band's award-winning debut album For Emma, Forever Ago, self-released in 2007 by Bon Iver frontman and founder Justin Vernon, and re-released in 2008.

Information
The title track was written with the previous album but didn't "feel right" and was not released.

"Woods" was sampled in Kanye West's single "Lost in the World" from his 2010 album My Beautiful Dark Twisted Fantasy, and re-recorded as "Still" by Justin Vernon's side-project, Volcano Choir, for their debut album Unmap. It was featured in a Series 3 episode of Skins.

Jagjaguwar has said the following about the content of the EP:
As much as Emma is about the cold, the Blood Bank collection is about the warmth that gets you through it. You can feel the air move. Like a fire you've been stoking for hours and finally got to sustain itself, the heat blisters your face while your back is frozen solid.

The EP entered the Billboard 200 at No. 16 with 23,000 copies sold. 79 percent of the sales were digital. As of October 2009 it has sold 89,000 copies in United States according to Nielsen SoundScan.

A reissue of the EP with both the original songs and their live versions was released on March 27, 2020.

Track listing

Personnel
Bon Iver
Justin Vernon

Additional personnel
Mark Paulson — nylon guitar , recording
Lauren Hudgins — front cover photo
Ashley Farland — back and inside photos

Charts

Cover versions 
The Tallest Man on Earth recorded a version of "Blood Bank" for his 2022 album of covers, Too Late for Edelweiss.

Architects (UK band) recorded a version of “Blood Bank” for their 2013 deluxe edition release of their album Daybreaker.

References

Bon Iver albums
2009 debut EPs
Jagjaguwar albums
Albums produced by Justin Vernon